"Money, Cash, Hoes" is a song by American rapper Jay-Z as the third single from his third album Vol. 2... Hard Knock Life (1998). It was released on December 18, 1998.  While the album version features a guest verse from rapper DMX, the remix features fellow rappers and Roc-A-Fella artists Memphis Bleek and Beanie Sigel with production by Swizz Beatz. Its beat features a sample of  "Theme of Thief" from the 1989 Sega game "Golden Axe". Producer Swizz Beatz stated that the glissando sounds were made by Swizz Beatz sliding his hand across a keyboard, originally as a joke. The remix version is featured on the soundtrack to the movie The Corruptor. In the end of the track, Pain in Da Ass talks, recreating dialogue from the film Goodfellas.

Critical reception
AllMusic's Dave Connolly describes the remix as "less than stellar," while Steve Juon of RapReviews.com considers it to be a "noteworthy" song that "Jay-Z fans will appreciate."

Charts

See also
List of songs recorded by Jay-Z

References

1998 singles
1998 songs
Jay-Z songs
DMX (rapper) songs
Song recordings produced by Swizz Beatz
Songs written by Jay-Z
Songs written by Swizz Beatz
Roc-A-Fella Records singles
Def Jam Recordings singles
Songs written by DMX (rapper)